Richard Forshaw (20 August 1895 – 26 August 1963) was a footballer who played, predominantly, for Liverpool and also Merseyside rivals Everton during the period between the First and Second World Wars. The only player ever to win league titles with both of the two Merseyside rivals, he also played for Wolverhampton Wanderers, Hednesford Town, and Rhyl Athletic.

Life and playing career

Born Preston, Lancashire, England, Forshaw played for both Nottm Forest and Middlesbrough in wartime matches before gaining his first professional contract at Liverpool in 1919. He made his debut in a 1–0 defeat to Arsenal at Highbury in a Division 1 fixture on 8 September 1919, he opened his account 12 days later at Villa Park when his 30th-minute strike was the only goal of the game against Aston Villa.

Forshaw continued to find the net on a regular basis and his goals helped the Anfield club gain back-to-back titles in 1922 and 1923, he was an ever-present in the 84 championship matches and scored a remarkable 36 goals, his average was a respectable goal every 2⅓ games during this spell not at all bad for an inside-forward. Forshaw also topped the Liverpool scoring list in 1924–25 with 19 goals.

The slim built 5'10" Forshaw was to have his best season in the red of Liverpool in 1925–26 when his return from the 35 matches he played was 29 goals, a goal every 1.2 games. This included a hat-trick against bitter rivals Manchester United, at Anfield, which ended with Liverpool defeating United 5–0 with Forshaw scoring in the 21st, 63rd and 70th minutes, Forshaw's striking partner Harry Chambers scored in the 55th minute whilst the final goal was put away by Archie Rawlings 4 minutes from time.

Forshaw was allowed to leave Liverpool in March 1927, he made the short journey across Stanley Park to Everton where he linked up with Toffees legend Dixie Dean, Forshaw's experience helped Everton win the League title in his first season, becoming the first and only player to win the title with both Everton and Liverpool. Dick went on to join Wolves in 1929, he also played for Hednesford Town, Rhyl Athletic and Waterford before he finally retired. Forshaw was never selected to play for England.

In 1932 Forshaw was sentenced to 12 months imprisonment with hard labour for fraud after being found to have amended a winning betting slip from £2 to £20 by adding the 0 on himself.

Career details

Liverpool F.C (1919–1927) 288 appearances 124 goals - Two Football League First Division Championship winners medals (1922 and 1923)
Everton F.C (1927–1929) 42 appearances 8 goals - Football League First Division Championship winners medal (1930)

References

External links
Player profile at LFChistory.net

1895 births
Footballers from Preston, Lancashire
1963 deaths
Association football forwards
English footballers
Liverpool F.C. players
Everton F.C. players
Wolverhampton Wanderers F.C. players
Hednesford Town F.C. players
Rhyl F.C. players
English Football League players